

Qualification system
A total of 56 athletes will qualify to compete at the Games (32 male, 24 female). Each country is allowed to enter a maximum of three male and three female athletes. The top ten men's teams and top eight women's teams (including Canada) at the 2014 Pan American Sports Festival will qualify for the games. A further two wildcards will be allocated (2 men). A nation may enter a maximum of two athletes per singles events, and one doubles per event.

Qualification timeline

Qualification summary

Men

Women

Originally a women's wildcard was to be awarded, but it was reallocated to a second men's wildcard for unknown reasons.

References

External links
Pan American Sports Festival Squash Results

P
Qualification for the 2015 Pan American Games
Squash at the 2015 Pan American Games